Eugenia is a Mexican telenovela produced by Televisa for Telesistema Mexicano in 1963.

Cast 
Miguel Manzano
Maricruz Olivier - Eugenia
Hortensia Santoveña
Bertha Moss
Andrea Palma
Celia Manzano
María Eugenia Ríos
Enrique Lizalde
Augusto Benedico
Jacqueline Andere

References

External links 

Mexican telenovelas
1963 telenovelas
Televisa telenovelas
1963 Mexican television series debuts
1963 Mexican television series endings
Spanish-language telenovelas